La Main Rouge was a French terrorist organization operated by the French foreign intelligence agency  (External Documentation and Counter-Espionage Service), or SDECE, in the 1950s. Its purpose was to eliminate the supporters of Algerian independence and the leading members of the Front de Libération Nationale (FLN) during the Algerian War.

The assassination of the Tunisian labor unionist and independence activist Farhat Hached December 5, 1952 is attributed to La Main Rouge.

Several bomb attacks took place in the Federal Republic of Germany, like the assassination attempts of the arms dealer Otto Schlüter on 26 September 1956 and 3 June 1957, and  the killing of Georg Puchert (alias Captain Morris) on 3 March 1959. These would ultimately never be solved.

On 27 November 1959, the then 30-year-old Christian Durieux gave an interview in which he claimed the attempts against the lives of Schlüter and Puchert and the bomb attack in the port of Hamburg against the cargo ship Atlas on 1 October 1958, all on behalf of La Main Rouge. He also claimed responsibility for the assassination of FLN official Aït Ahcène in Bonn, in November 1958.

The ambassador of the Algerian FLN in West-Germany, Améziane Aït Ahcène, was shot out of a moving car on November 5, 1958 in Bonn and died months later in a Tunisian hospital. The attack is attributed to La Main Rouge.

The freighters Emma, en route from Tangier to Gibraltar on 30 July 1957, and Alkaira, in Ostend on 13 April 1959, were destroyed by explosive charges planted by La Main Rouge.

In particular, the apparent inaction of the French authorities was seen abroad as a note of the French government that they had caused the aggressive crackdown on supporters of the FLN.

See also 

 Organisation armée secrète

References

Bibliography 
 Helmut Roewer, Stefan Schäfer, Matthias Uhl: Lexikon of the intelligence services in the 20th century. Herbig, Munich 2003, .
 Subchapters: Against West Germany, in: Matthias Ritzi/Erich Schmidt-Eenboom: In the shadow of the Third Reich. The BND and his agent Richard Christmann, Berlin (Christoph links Verlag) 2011, S. 186-200 
 Pierre Genève: La main rouge, Paris (Éd. Nord-Sud) in 1960.
 Antoine Méléro: La main rouge. L ' Armée secrète de la République, Paris (ed. du Rocher) 1997 
 Claus Leggewie: Porter. The Algeria project of the left in the Adenauer Germany, Berlin (red book publisher) 1984 
 Wolfgang Kraushaar: The protest Chronicle 1949-1959 - an illustrated history of movement, resistance and Utopia. Vol. I-IV. Rogner & Bernhard at Zweitausendeins, Hamburg of 1996 .

Organizations established in the 1950s
Directorate-General for External Security
Espionage scandals and incidents
Terrorism in France
Maritime incidents in 1957
Maritime incidents in 1958
Maritime incidents in 1959
Improvised explosive device bombings in Germany
Paramilitary organizations based in France
State-sponsored terrorism
Terrorism in Germany
Algerian War
French intelligence operations
Terrorism committed by France